Fevziye Rahgozar Barlas (born 1955 Balkh) is an Afghan poet, and short story writer.

Life
She is the daughter of Shafee Rahgozar.
She graduated high school in Kabul, and married Rai Barlas.
She graduated from Istanbul University in 1977.
She worked for the Minister for Information and Culture.
In 1979, she went into exile.
She was a Senior Editor and News Anchor, Radio Free Europe/Radio Liberty. 
She graduated from University of Washington with an MA in 1996.

Works
Dayer-e Shegeftiha (Wonderland), 1999
The Heavens are my Father, 2001
Wondering Eyes

References

External links
From ...and the Heavens are my Father (September 2001),
New Pictures from Solidaire Provence Afghanistan 
Is the Time Finally Ripe For Afghan Women's Rights?

1955 births
People from Balkh Province
20th-century Afghan poets
Afghan women poets
Istanbul University alumni
University of Washington alumni
Living people
20th-century Afghan women writers
21st-century Afghan poets
21st-century Afghan women writers
Afghan short story writers
Afghan women short story writers
20th-century short story writers
21st-century short story writers